Lilach Parisky (born 21 July 1972) is an Israeli Olympic fencer.

Fencing career
Parisky came in 17th in foil at the 1993 World Fencing Championships.

She competed in the women's individual and team foil events for Israel at the 1996 Summer Olympics in Atlanta, at 19 years of age.

In the individual women's foil event, Parisky won in the First Round, defeating Yanina Iannuzzi of Argentina, but lost in the Second Round. In the First Round of the team foil event, against China she went 1-1-1 (defeating Liang Jun and tying with Xiao Aihua). In the Second Round against the United States she went 1-2 (defeating Felicia Zimmermann), as Israel came in 9th.

Parisky came in 20th in foil at the 1998 World Fencing Championships. She then came in 41st in foil at the 1999 World Fencing Championships.

References

External links
 

1972 births
Living people
Israeli female foil fencers
Olympic fencers of Israel
Fencers at the 1996 Summer Olympics
20th-century Israeli women